Guinness World Records – Ab India Todega (English: Guinness World Records – Now India will Break) is an Indian English-language reality TV show based on the Guinness Book of World Records. The show, which was hosted by Preity Zinta and Shabbir Ahluwalia, premiered on 18 March 2011 to an audience measurement of 3.3 rating points. Each episode presents different individuals trying to break official world records.

Format
The format of the show is similar to that of previous TV shows based on the book of world records. The show's initial goal was to break over 70 Guinness World Records. Kristian Teufel, an official Guinness World Records adjudicator, is present on stage while every participant attempts to break a record and constitutes the final authority on the record, being the one who analyses the performance and announces the results.

References

External links
 Official site
Entry on Colors Channel 
World Records Listing

Indian reality television series
Colors TV original programming
2011 Indian television series debuts
Guinness World Records
Indian television series based on British television series